Retin Obasohan (born 6 July 1993) is a Belgian professional basketball player for ASVEL of the French LNB Pro A and the EuroLeague.

Early career
In the 2010–11 season, Obasohan played for amateur team Kangoeroes Boom in the Belgian Second Division.

College career
From 2011 through 2016, Obasohan played for the Alabama Crimson Tide. He redshirted the 2011 season and continued to gain more playing time throughout his career. In his redshirt senior season, Obasohan averaged 17.6 points per game for the team. He led his team to NCAA tournament contention and numerous upset victories, including several wins against AP ranked opponents and a win at LSU against that year's NBA first overall pick Ben Simmons. Upon conclusion of the 2016 season, Obasohan was named to the All-SEC First Team and was named SEC Scholar-Athlete of the Year as well.

|-
| style="text-align:left;"| 2012-13
| style="text-align:left;"| Alabama
| 31 || 1 || 13.0 || .374 || .286 || .771 || 1.4 || .7 || .9 || .3 || 3.9
|-
| style="text-align:left;"| 2013-14
| style="text-align:left;"| Alabama
| 30 || 20 || 28.7 || .381 || .246 || .667 || 3.0 || 1.6 || 1.8 || 1.0 || 9.5
|-
| style="text-align:left;"| 2014-15
| style="text-align:left;"| Alabama
| 31 || 12 || 19.5 || .447 || .378 || .606 || 2.9 || .8 || .9 || .5 || 6.2
|-
| style="text-align:left;"| 2015-16
| style="text-align:left;"| Alabama
| 33 || 33 || 32.3 || .471 || .372 || .699 || 3.8 || 2.6 || 1.4 || .3 || 17.6
|- class="sortbottom"
| style="text-align:center;" colspan="2"| Career
| 125 || 66 || 23.5 || .433 || .335 || .683 || 2.8 || 1.5 || 1.2 || .5 || 9.4

Professional career
Obasohan entered the 2016 NBA draft, but went undrafted. On 28 June he signed a free-agent contract with the Sacramento Kings, as he went on to play in the 2016 NBA Summer League.

On 5 August 2016 Obasohan signed with Sidigas Avellino of the Italian Lega Basket Serie A.

On 4 August 2017 Obasohan signed with Rockets Gotha, newcomer in the German Basketball Bundesliga. On 1 April 2018 he scored a season-high 25 points in a 98–90 win over Eisbären Bremerhaven.

In October 2018, Obasohan joined the Northern Arizona Suns of the NBA G League as a local tryout player.

During the 2019-20 season, Obasohan plays in Germany for Brose Bamberg in the Basketball Bundesliga. He averaged 8.4 points and 2.7 assists per game.

On 24 October 2020 he signed with ERA Nymburk in the Czech NBL.

On 1 July 2021 he signed with Hapoel Jerusalem of the Israeli Premier League.

On 8 July 2022 he signed a deal with ASVEL Basket of the French LNB Pro A.

References

External links
Alabama Crimson Tide bio

1993 births
Living people
Alabama Crimson Tide men's basketball players
ASVEL Basket players
Belgian expatriate basketball people in Germany
Belgian expatriate sportspeople in Israel
Belgian expatriate basketball people in Italy
Belgian expatriate basketball people in the United States
Belgian men's basketball players
Belgian people of Yoruba descent
Black Belgian sportspeople
Hapoel Jerusalem B.C. players
Lega Basket Serie A players
Northern Arizona Suns players
Point guards
Rockets (basketball club) players
S.S. Felice Scandone players
Sportspeople from Antwerp